DAV University is a private university in Jalandhar, Punjab, founded in 2013 under the aegis of DAV Trust. DAV University at Jalandhar traces its roots to the legacy of Dayanand Anglo-Vedic Schools System that has been reforming and redefining India's educational scenario for 128 years. The university is the culmination of the movement that started with the foundation of the first DAV institute to propagate the ideals of the religious and social reformer Swami Dayanand Saraswati in Lahore on 1 June 1886. The university has adopted 5 surrounding villages and doing many works of public welfare there. The university is in the process of getting National Assessment and Accreditation Council and Indian Council of Agricultural Research accreditation.

Campus
The 72-acre campus is on the outskirts of Jalandhar in the Punjab province. The campus is on the Jalandhar-Pathankot highway. It includes capacity for its own water supply, on-campus canteens and parking in the basement. The campus also includes a number of playing fields. The university is known for its research-oriented faculty and is able to get research funding from the government agencies like Department of Science and Technology as well as Council of Scientific and Industrial Research, Government of India.

Departments
The university runs following departments.
Economics and Business studies
Agricultural Sciences
Biochemistry
Botany and Environment studies
Biotechnology
Microbiology
Zoology
Chemistry
Physics
English
Education
Mathematics
Psychology

Admissions
The university admits students either based on marks of the last qualifying examination or it may conduct own entrance (PhD entrance) tests for admission in various undergraduate, postgraduate and doctoral programs.

References

External links
 

Universities in Punjab, India
Universities and colleges affiliated with the Arya Samaj
Education in Jalandhar
2013 establishments in Punjab, India
Educational institutions established in 2013